Mafizuddin Ahmed ( – 26 September 1997) was a Bangladeshi educationist and scientist. He served as the first vice-chancellor of Jahangirnagar University. He was a founding fellow of the Bangladesh Academy of Sciences.

Early life and education
Ahmed completed his bachelor's and master's in Chemistry from the University of Dhaka in 1942 and 1944 respectively. He earned his Ph.D. degree from Pennsylvania State University in 1948.

Career
Ahmed joined the Department of Chemistry of the University of Dhaka in 1948 as a senior lecturer. He was also a member of both the Senate and the Syndicate of the Bangladesh University of Engineering and Technology (BUET).

Ahmed was appointed the first vice-chancellor of Jahangirnagar University and served during 24 September 1970 - 1 February 1972. In 1987, he headed the National Education Commission (popularly called Mafiz Commission after him).

Ahmed was the founder president of the Bangladesh Chemical Society, established in 1972.

Awards
 Tamgha-e-Pakistan (1966)
 Independence Day Award (1986)
 Bangladesh Chemical Society Gold Medal (1988)

References 

1920s births
1997 deaths
People from Tangail District
University of Dhaka alumni
Eberly College of Science alumni
Academic staff of the University of Dhaka
Recipients of the Independence Day Award
Vice-Chancellors of Jahangirnagar University
Fellows of Bangladesh Academy of Sciences